Chatfield College was a private Roman Catholic college in St. Martin and Cincinnati, Ohio. Chatfield was founded by the Ursulines of Brown County in 1971. Chatfield offered the Associate of Arts and Associate of Applied Science degrees. The college was accredited by the Higher Learning Commission.

Chatfield College ceased operations as a college in January 2023. It transitioned into a non-profit organization (called the Chatfield Edge) designed to support non-traditional and first-generation college students at other colleges in Cincinnati and the Southwest Ohio areas.

Gallery

References

External links

http://www.ohiohighered.org/collegecreditplus/
https://www.hlcommission.org/

Buildings and structures in Brown County, Ohio
Education in Brown County, Ohio
Catholic universities and colleges in Ohio
Roman Catholic Archdiocese of Cincinnati